The SsangYong Transstar is a luxury coach made using components derived from Mercedes-Benz buses. It is available in three trim levels: luxury express bus, express bus and tourist express bus. The bus is very popular in South Korea and former Soviet nations. The name "Transstar" comes from the words "transportation" and "star".

History
SsangYong started development on the Transstar in 1991. The development lasted for three years and had total cost of 20 billion won.

References

Transstar
Buses
Coaches (bus)